Leucadendron teretifolium, the needle-leaf conebush, is a flower-bearing shrub belonging to the genus Leucadendron and forms part of the fynbos. The plant is native to the Western Cape, South Africa.

Description
Fire destroys the plant but the seeds survive. The seeds are stored in a toll on the female plant and are released after a fire and are possibly spread by the wind. The plant is unisexual and there are male and female plants. It is fertilized by the wind.

Distribution and habitat
The plant occurs on the Elimvlakte, Kleinrivierberge, Riviersonderendberge, Potberg, Bonteberg, Witteberg, Waboomsberg, and Langeberg.

Gallery

References

External links

teretifolium
Taxa named by Henry Cranke Andrews